Saiful Azam (11 September 1941 – 14 June 2020) was a Bangladeshi pilot and politician who first served as a fighter pilot for the Pakistan Air Force (PAF) (1960–1971) and later the Bangladesh Air Force (BAF) (1971–1979). During his career as PAF pilot, he shot down one Indian Air Force (IAF) and three Israel Air Force (IAF) aircraft. For his actions, he received various gallantry awards from Pakistan, Jordan and Iraq. He also took part in 12 ground-attack missions against the Indian forces. After the liberation of Bangladesh, he joined the newly formed Bangladesh Air Force.

In 1980, Azam retired as a Group Captain from Bangladesh Air Force. After retiring from the military, Azam continued government service on contract basis and started his own private trading firm. Azam was a one term parliament member('91~'95) representing his hometown seat of Pabna in the Bangladesh Nationalist Party (BNP) ticket. He died on 14 June 2020 at 13:00 hours at the Combined Military Hospital, Dhaka.

Personal life and education
Azam was born in Khagarbaria village, Pabna District, East Bengal, British India (later East Pakistan and now Bangladesh) in 1941. After completing his secondary schooling in East Pakistan, he moved to West Pakistan and joined the Pakistan Air Force College in Sargodha. After that he joined the Pakistan Air Force Academy, Risalpur in 1958, successfully gaining commission as an officer in the PAF's General Duties Pilot or GD (P) branch in 1960. Saiful Azam was married to Nishat Azam who is a lawyer.

Service with the Pakistan Air Force (1960–1971) 
After training with the Cessna T-37 aircraft and further education at Luke Air Force Base, Arizona, with F-86 Sabres, in 1963, Azam was posted briefly in Dhaka before becoming an instructor with the T-33s at PAF's No. 2 Squadron (Jet Conversion Unit) in Mauripur, Karachi. While still posted as an instructor, Azam flew in the September 1965 war with India as part of PAF's No. 17 Squadron from PAF Base Sargodha, flying F-86s. After returning from a successful ground attack, Azam's group encountered Indian Folland Gnat interceptors; Azam shot down Flying Officer Mayadev of the Indian Air Force. Flying Officer Mayadev ejected and was captured by Pakistani soldiers on the ground. Throughout the 1965 war, Azam took part in 12 ground-attack missions which inflicted very heavy damage to the Indian forces. For his actions, Azam was awarded the Sitara-e-Jurat, Pakistan's third highest military award. In 1966, he assumed the command of PAF's No. 2 Squadron.

In November 1966, he was sent by the Pakistan Air Force on deputation as an adviser to the Royal Jordanian Air Force. During the 1967 Arab Israel war, Flight Lieutenant Saiful Azam shot down a Dassault Mystère IV a supersonic aircraft belonging to the Israeli Air Force while flying a Hawker Hunter. A day later, he was shifted to an Iraqi airbase where he shot down a Vautour IIA and Dassault Mirage III belonging to the Israeli Air Force, all these fighter aircraft shot down only in two missions this remains the highest shooting record of Israeli Air Force aircraft till today.

In 1969, after completing his overseas deputation, he returned in service to the PAF and spent several years as flight commander at various PAF bases before the Creation of Bangladesh.

Service with the Bangladesh Air Force (1971–1979) 
After the independence of Bangladesh in 1971, Azam entered service with the newly formed Bangladesh Air Force in 1974, serving as Director of Flight Safety and Director of Operations before being given command of the Dhaka Air Base and promoted to Group Captain in 1977. He retired in 1980 as Group Captain.

Post-retirement (1980–2020) 
Following his retirement from the military, he joined the Bangladesh Nationalist Party (BNP). As BNP candidate, Saiful took part in the fifth parliamentary election from Pabna-3 and achieved victory.

Subsequently, he entered the private business sector as the Managing Director of Natasha Trading Agency and as the director of a travel agency with his wife.

He lived with his wife in Dhaka Cantonment Defense Officers Housing Society (DOHS), while his adult son and daughters live in the state of Arizona, United States.

Career achievements
Saiful Azam flew for four air forces (Bangladesh, Pakistan, Jordan and Iraq). He allegedly  destroyed fighter planes of two different air forces (India and Israel) while serving for Pakistan Air Force. As of 2012, he held the record for shooting down more Israeli aircraft than any other, total 3. In 2001, a non-profit & private organisation named The Gathering of Eagles Foundation rewarded him as one of the Living Eagles at Gathering of Eagles Program, their annual aviation event of 2000

Death
Azam died on 14 June 2020 at a Combined Military Hospital in Dhaka. Air Chief of Bangladesh Air Force Masihuzzaman Serniabat expressed deep shock and sadness for his death. A state funeral was arranged at the BAF Base Khademul Bashar parade ground including a fly past in honor of him.

Pakistan Air Force chief Mujahid Anwar Khan and the Palestine ambassador to Pakistan, Ahmed Rabie, expressed grief over the Azam's death. Mujahid Anwar Khan stated that Azam was an exceptional fighter pilot who would always be remembered for his valour and professionalism. Ahmed Rabie stated that "on behalf of all Palestinians, I send our deepest condolences to his family in Pakistan and in Bangladesh."

Bangladesh Nationalist Party (BNP) secretary general, Mirza Fakhrul Islam Alamgir, also expressed his shock and sorrow at the death of the former BNP politician.

See also
 Sattar Alvi
 Muhammad Mahmood Alam
 8-Pass Charlie

References

1941 births
2020 deaths
Pakistan Air Force officers
Pakistani flying aces
Bangladesh Air Force personnel
Bangladeshi aviators
Pilots of the Indo-Pakistani War of 1965
PAF College Sargodha alumni
Aviation record holders
5th Jatiya Sangsad members
Pakistani aviation record holders
Six-Day War pilots